Shahid (also Romanized as Shahīd; also known as Gheshlagh Shahid and Qeshlāq-e Shahīd) is a village in Sang Sefid Rural District, Qareh Chay District, Khondab County, Markazi Province, Iran. At the 2006 census, its population was 439, in 88 families.

References 

Populated places in Khondab County